Honley railway station serves the village of Honley in the Holme Valley of West Yorkshire, England.

The station was opened by the Huddersfield & Sheffield Junction Railway (a constituent company of the Lancashire & Yorkshire Railway) in 1850. 
The railway line through Honley has been single since 1989, with only one platform (the former northbound one) in use for both directions

Facilities

In August 2013, plans were released to install electronic customer real-time information screens (CIS) at the station. It was later revealed by Metro that they were to be installed in May/June 2015.  These are now (December 2016) in use.  The station is unmanned and has no ticket machine, so tickets must be purchased on the train or in advance.  A customer help point and timetable posters are provided in addition to the CIS screens to offer train running information.  A single waiting shelter is located next to the station entrance; there is no step-free access however, as the platform is above street level and can only be reached by stairs from the car park below.

Services 

Gallery

References 

Railway stations in Kirklees
DfT Category F2 stations
Holme Valley
Former Lancashire and Yorkshire Railway stations
Railway stations in Great Britain opened in 1850
Northern franchise railway stations
railway station